Vasily Kondratievich Sazonov (Russian: Василий Кондратьевич Сазонов; 1789—1870) was a Russian history painter in the Classical style. Member of the Imperial Academy of Arts

Biography 
He was born a serf; belonging to Count Nikolay Rumyantsev. While participating in the hunts at Gomel Palace, young Sazonov would make sketches. These were noticed by the Count, who sent him to study at the Imperial Academy of Arts in 1804. He studied under the history painter Grigory Ugryumov and showed such rapid progress that the Count gave him his freedom.

He was heavily influenced by Ugryumov's style and also became a history painter. In 1812, he was awarded a gold medal for a scene from the life of Kuzma Minin and, in 1813, received another gold medal for a scene depicting the resistance to Napoleon's capture of Moscow.

He graduated in 1815 with the title of "Artist" and received a small stipend to continue his studies. In 1817, Count Rumyantsev gave him enough money to go abroad. He went to Rome, where he copied the Old Masters.

Upon returning to Saint Petersburg, he produced two major historical works: Dmitry Donskoy at the Battle of Kulikovo and Count Ostermann-Tolstoy undergoing surgery at the Battle of Kulm. Later, he painted an iconostasis for the newly rebuilt Transfiguration Cathedral and created decorations for the Tauride Palace. These projects earned him the title of Academician in 1830.

For the next twelve years, he received numerous commissions for religious paintings in Saint Petersburg's churches, interrupted by the occasional portrait. Some of his most notable works are in the church of the Semyonovsky Regiment and the church on Aptekarsky Island.

Works

References

Literary sources

External links 

1789 births
1870 deaths
19th-century painters from the Russian Empire
Russian male painters
History painters
Religious artists
People from Gomel
19th-century male artists from the Russian Empire